Arthur Chichester, 1st Baron Templemore (8 January 1797 – 26 September 1837) was a British soldier, politician and courtier.

Chichester was born in Westminster, London, the eldest son of Lord Spencer Chichester, third son of Arthur Chichester, 1st Marquess of Donegall. His mother was Lady Anne Harriet Stewart, daughter of John Stewart, 7th Earl of Galloway. He was educated in England, matriculating at Brasenose College, Oxford in 1815, and entered the British Army, serving with the 2nd Life Guards and eventually attaining the rank of lieutenant colonel in 1827.

In 1826 Chichester was elected Whig Member of Parliament for Milborne Port, a seat he held for four years before becoming representative for County Wexford in 1830. The following year, on the occasion of the coronation of William IV, he was raised to the peerage as Baron Templemore, of Templemore in the County of Donegal ("Templemore" refers to the civil parish in the city of Derry, Northern Ireland). He was also made a Gentleman of the Bedchamber in 1835, and in 1837 succeeded this appointment as a Lord in Waiting.

Lord Templemore married Lady Augusta Paget, daughter of Henry Paget, 1st Marquess of Anglesey, in 1820. They had five sons and two daughters. He died after a short illness aged 40 at his home of Coombe Bank, Kent, and was buried at nearby Sundridge. His wife outlived him by thirty-five years, dying in 1872.

References

External links

1797 births
1837 deaths
People from Westminster
Barons in the Peerage of the United Kingdom
British Life Guards officers
Alumni of Brasenose College, Oxford
Members of the Parliament of the United Kingdom for English constituencies
Members of the Parliament of the United Kingdom for County Wexford constituencies (1801–1922)
UK MPs 1826–1830
UK MPs 1830–1831
UK MPs who were granted peerages
Whig (British political party) Lords-in-Waiting
Whig (British political party) MPs for English constituencies
Whig (British political party) MPs for Irish constituencies
Arthur
Peers of the United Kingdom created by William IV